Olga San Nicolás Rolando (born 23 March 2005), simply known as Olga, is a Spanish professional footballer who plays as a forward for Liga F club Valencia CF.

Club career 
Olga has participated in 16 matches for Valencia (14 in the Women Spanish League and two in the Copa de Reina cup) for a total of minutes 528 minutes. She has scored one goal and assisted two in the 2021–22 season.

References

External links

2005 births
Living people
Spanish women's footballers
Women's association football forwards
Valencia CF Femenino players
Primera División (women) players
Spain women's youth international footballers